Luis de Sousa Pereira Vaz (born 28 May 1989), known as Zé Luis, is a Mozambican footballer who plays as a midfielder.

References

1989 births
Living people
Mozambican footballers
Mozambique international footballers
Association football midfielders
Baladeyet El Mahalla SC players
Liga Desportiva de Maputo players
C.F. União players
FC Chibuto players
GD Maputo players
Liga Portugal 2 players
Mozambican expatriate footballers
Mozambican expatriate sportspeople in Egypt
Mozambican expatriate sportspeople in Portugal
Expatriate footballers in Egypt
Expatriate footballers in Portugal